Kazakovite was named in honor of Maria Efimovna Kazakova analytical chemist. It is a type locality of Karnasurt mountain, Russia. It was approved by the IMA in 1974, the same year it was discovered.

Properties 
Kazakovite is a cation-saturated member of the lovozerite group and the zirsinalite-lovozerite subgroup. It occurs in sodalite syenites, and disseminated in ussingite. X-ray studies show the mineral to be rhombohedral. It occurs as small crystals (0.01 – 2 mm), and is showing the forms {111} and {114}. Kazakovite mainly consists of oxygen (44.59%), silicon (25.65%) and sodium (19.58%), but also contains titanium (4.45%), manganese (3.40%), iron (1.73%) and potassium (0.61%). It has a barely detectable, 8.56 radioactivity measured in Gamma Ray American Petroleum Institute Units. It is radioactive due to containing potassium, even though in low amounts. The concentration measured in GRapi is 11.68%.

Tisinalite 
After its discovery, it was quickly noticed the mineral is unstable in air. The mineral became covered in efflorescence of natron and thermonatrite after several days in room conditions. After special experimental studies, it was found that the mineral alters in air into H-kazakovite, better known as tisinalite. The process is complete after several weeks of exposure to moist air.

References

Minerals